Kristian Bye-Andersen (born 26 September 1975) is a retired Norwegian football striker.

A very prolific goalscorer in sixth-tier Liungen IF, he was picked up by Mjøndalen IF in 1993 where he played junior football. He was not offered a senior contract and returned to Liungen, now on the fifth tier. In 1995 he scored about 50 league goals.

Chased by a number of clubs, in 1997 he signed for second-tier Eik-Tønsberg. Following 13 goals in the 1999 1. divisjon he was signed by first-tier club Odd. Following a loan to Ørn-Horten and little playing time in Odd in 2001 and 2002, he continued two years in Tollnes before retiring.

He came out of retirement to play for Skotfoss in 2007, then rejoined Liungen. He finished his career in Sparta/Bragerøen which changed its name to Stoppen.

References

1975 births
Living people
People from Lier, Norway
Norwegian footballers
Eik-Tønsberg players
Odds BK players
FK Ørn-Horten players
Tollnes BK players
Norwegian First Division players
Eliteserien players
Association football forwards
Sportspeople from Viken (county)